Allchurch is a surname. Notable people with the surname include:

 Denis Allchurch (born 1953), Canadian politician in Saskatchewan
 Ivor Allchurch (1929–1997), Welsh international footballer, brother of Len
 Len Allchurch (born 1933), Welsh international footballer, brother of Ivor
 Thomas Allchurch (1883–1934), English-born cricketer who played for Worcestershire